= Malka Silberstein =

Estonian lawyer

Malka Silberstein (November 15, 1903, Vilnius, Russian Empire – 1941, Hiiumaa, Estonia) was one of the first lawyers in the Republic of Estonia. The young and successful wheelchair lawyer, with her long red hair, was a striking figure in Estonia during the interwar years. In the late 1920s, she was involved with two lawyers for the abolition of the death penalty in the Estonian Penal Code. After 1940, she went on to be a controversial figure, working for the People's Commissariat for Internal Affairs (NKVD).
